The voiceless alveolar lateral flap is a type of consonantal sound, used in some spoken languages.

Features
Features of the voiceless alveolar lateral flap:

Occurrence

Notes

References

External links
 List of languages with /ɺ̥/ 

Alveolar consonants
Lateral consonants
Tap and flap consonants
Pulmonic consonants
Oral consonants